The Gran Meliá Ghoo is a five-star hotel in a mixed-development building currently in development in Salman Shahr, Iran, on the shore of the Caspian Sea. When finished, the tower will be 130 meters high and comprise a hotel, residential apartments, and a retail mall.

The hotel is planned to contain 319 rooms as well as other accommodations such as seven restaurants and bars, two swimming pools, and a spa. The hotel is a project of the Spain-based Meliá  Hotels International, making it the first in Iran to be foreign-branded, since the Revolution 

The hotel is part of the Ghoo, Middle East Diamond-development led by Iranian businessman Ahad Azim Zadeh.

Other developments 
In addition to the hotel, there are two buildings with residential apartments, and a retail mall which is already open to the public.

According to Canadian business news website Meetings Canada, it will become the largest mixed development structure in Iran when completed.

References

Further reading
 "Meliá anuncia el primer cinco estrellas internacional en Irán". ABC. 
 "Iran to Get Luxury Hotel Along Caspian Sea as Tourism Thaws". Bloomberg News.
 "Gran Meliá to open first hotel in Iran". Conference & Incentive Travel.

Hotels in Iran
Apartments
Shopping malls in Iran